Pakisonasi Afu (born 7 September 1990) is a professional rugby footballer who has represented Tonga in rugby league and Tonga A in rugby union. He is contracted to Austin Elite Rugby to play Major League Rugby in the United States. Afu previously played rugby league in the NSW Cup for New Zealand Warriors and Wyong Roos as a prop. His usual position in rugby union is centre.

Early life
Pakisonasi Afu was born in Auckland, New Zealand. He played rugby league as an Otahuhu Leopards junior before moving to Australia in 2008.

Playing career

Rugby league
Afu played for the Canterbury Bulldogs in the Toyota Cup between 2008 and 2010. He was a Tongan international in 2009, and in 2010 he was named in the Junior Kiwis squad.

He signed with the Parramatta Eels for 2011 and played for the Wentworthville Magpies in the Bundaberg Red Cup. Following this, Afu went on a Mormon mission to the Philippines.

In 2014, he returned to New Zealand and the Otahuhu Leopards, playing in the Auckland Rugby League competition. In 2015, after moving to the Point Chevalier Pirates, he was selected for Auckland and also played for the New Zealand Warriors in the NSW Cup. Later that year he was signed by the Sydney Roosters.

He played for the Wyong Roos, the Roosters' reserve side, in the NSW Cup in 2016.

Rugby union
Afu switched codes to rugby union in 2017, representing  in the Pacific Challenge tournament where he scored two tries against , and in the Americas Pacific Challenge, scoring two tries against .

He signed with Austin Elite Rugby to play in the 2018 inaugural season of Major League Rugby in the United States.

References

External links
Sydney Roosters profile

1990 births
Living people
Auckland rugby league team players
Junior Kiwis players
New Zealand expatriates in the Philippines
New Zealand sportspeople of Tongan descent
New Zealand rugby league players
New Zealand rugby union players
Otahuhu Leopards players
People educated at St Paul's College, Auckland
Point Chevalier Pirates players
Rugby league players from Auckland
Rugby league props
Rugby league second-rows
Rugby union players from Auckland
Tonga national rugby league team players
Wentworthville Magpies players
Wyong Roos players